Brickellia filipes is a Mexican species of flowering plants in the family Asteraceae. It is native to western Mexico, the states of Oaxaca, Guerrero, Michoacán, Colima, and Jalisco.

References

filipes
Flora of Mexico
Plants described in 1917